David McLelland (born November 20, 1952) is a Canadian retired professional ice hockey goaltender who played two games in the National Hockey League with the Vancouver Canucks, on March 25 and March 31, 1973. The rest of his professional career was spent in the minor leagues, primarily with the Des Moines Capitols of the International Hockey League, before retiring in 1975.

Career statistics

Regular season and playoffs

All statistics are taken from NHL.com

References

External links

1952 births
Living people
Brandon Wheat Kings players
Canadian ice hockey goaltenders
Des Moines Capitols players
Sportspeople from Penticton
Seattle Totems (WHL) players
Vancouver Canucks draft picks
Vancouver Canucks players
Ice hockey people from British Columbia